The 1986 Vanderbilt Commodores football team represented Vanderbilt University in the 1986 NCAA Division I-A football season as a member of the Southeastern Conference (SEC). The Commodores were led by head coach Watson Brown in his first season and finished with a record of one win and ten losses (1–10 overall, 0–6 in the SEC).

Schedule

References

Vanderbilt
Vanderbilt Commodores football seasons
Vanderbilt Commodores football